William Wilton was a football manager.

William Wilton may also refer to:

William de Wylton (also Wilton), English medieval college Fellow and university chancellor
William McConnell Wilton, Northern Irish Unionist politician and footballer
William Wilton (MP) for Reading (UK Parliament constituency) 1413 and 1423

See also